Innards is a term used broadly to refer to the 'insides' of something, but may also refer to:

Offal
Viscera
Gastrointestinal tract
Innards: The Metaphysical Highway, a short film by the Chiodo Brothers